Green Pond is a small lake east of Moshier Falls in Herkimer County, New York. It drains west via an unnamed creek which flows into Sunday Creek.

See also
 List of lakes in New York

References 

Lakes of New York (state)
Lakes of Herkimer County, New York